RhoGEF domain describes two distinct structural domains with  guanine nucleotide exchange factor (GEF) activity to regulate small GTPases in the Rho family. Rho small GTPases are inactive when bound to GDP but active when bound to GTP; RhoGEF domains in proteins are able to promote GDP release and GTP binding to activate specific Rho family members, including RhoA, Rac1 and Cdc42.

The largest class of RhoGEFs is composed of proteins containing the "Dbl-homology" (DH) domain, which almost always is found together with a pleckstrin-homology (PH) domain to form a combined DH/PH domain structure.

A distinct class of RhoGEFs is those proteins containing the DOCK/CZH/DHR-2 domain. This structure has no sequence similarity with DBL-homology domains.

Human proteins containing DH/PH RhoGEF domain 
ABR;  AKAP13/ARHGEF13/Lbc;  ALS2;  ALS2CL;   ARHGEF1/p115-RhoGEF;  ARHGEF10;  ARHGEF10L;  ARHGEF11/PDZ-RhoGEF.;   ARHGEF12/LARG;  ARHGEF15;  ARHGEF16;  ARHGEF17;  ARHGEF18;  ARHGEF19;  ARHGEF2;  ARHGEF25;  ARHGEF26;  ARHGEF28;  ARHGEF3;  ARHGEF33;  ARHGEF35;  ARHGEF37; ARHGEF38;  ARHGEF39;  ARHGEF4;  ARHGEF40;  ARHGEF5;  ARHGEF6/alpha-PIX;  ARHGEF7/beta-PIX;  ARHGEF9;  BCR;  DNMBP;  ECT2;  ECT2L;  FARP1;  FARP2;  FGD1;  FGD2;  FGD3;  FGD4;  FGD5;  FGD6;   ITSN1/Intersectin 1;   ITSN2/Intersectin 2;  KALRN/Kalirin;  MCF2;  MCF2L;  MCF2L2;  NET1;  NGEF;  OBSCN;  PLEKHG1;  PLEKHG2;  PLEKHG3;  PLEKHG4;  PLEKHG4B;  PLEKHG5;  PLEKHG6;  PREX1;  PREX2;  RASGRF1;  RASGRF2; SPATA13;  TIAM1;  TIAM2;  TRIO;  VAV1;  VAV2;  VAV3.

Human proteins containing DOCK/CZH RhoGEF domain 
DOCK1/DOCK180;  DOCK2;  DOCK3/MOCA;  DOCK4;  DOCK5;  DOCK6/ZIR1;  DOCK7/ZIR2;  DOCK8/ZIR3;  DOCK9/Zizimin1;  DOCK10/Zizimin2;  DOCK11/Zizimin3

See also 
 GTPase
 Small GTPase
 Guanine nucleotide exchange factor
 Rho family of GTPases

References

Further reading 

 
 
 

Protein domains
Peripheral membrane proteins